The Cannons Lacrosse Club are a professional men's field lacrosse team in the Premier Lacrosse League (PLL) . Formerly based in Boston, Massachusetts, they played in Major League Lacrosse (MLL) as the Boston Cannons from their inaugural 2001 season to 2020. The team's home field was Veterans Memorial Stadium in nearby Quincy. In the MLL, the team won two Steinfeld Cup championship games in 2011 and 2020, the latter being the MLL's final championship. The Cannons joined the PLL in 2020 following the MLL–PLL merger and were rebranded as the Cannons Lacrosse Club.

Franchise History
The Cannons Lacrosse Club identity was adopted following the MLL-PLL merger in December 2020 for the team formerly known as Boston Cannons. They were the only MLL team identity to continue into the 2021 PLL season. The Boston Cannons were one of the original six teams of Major League Lacrosse (MLL), and the only team from the MLL's inaugural 2001 season to stay in the same market, without folding or moving elsewhere. MLL was founded by Jake Steinfeld, Dave Morrow, and Tim Robertson. The Cannons founder and president is Matt Dwyer. From their inaugural season of 2001 through 2003, the Cannons played their home games at Cawley Memorial Stadium in Lowell, Massachusetts. In their inaugural 2001 season, the Cannons finished with a record of 3–11 but still qualified for the playoffs finishing in second place in the division. In 2004, they moved to Nickerson Field at Boston University where they played through the 2006 season. The team qualified for the MLL playoffs 2001–2006, 2009-2011 and 2015. The Cannons won the 2004 and 2005 MLL American Division championships.

2011 championship season
The Cannons won the Steinfeld Cup for the first time in 2011, defeating the Hamilton Nationals 10–9. Boston went 9–3 in the regular season, their best record since going 10–2 in 2005. After losing to Chesapeake 13–9 in the 2010 semifinal, the Cannons avenged the Bayhawks by defeating them 14–13 in the 2011 semifinal with a goal from Max Quinzani. Boston became the fifth charter franchise to win a championship. By 2011, the Cannons were one of four charter franchises still in the league that started with six teams in 2001. The other three remaining charter franchises (Lizards, Bayhawks, and Rattlers had all previously won at least one Steinfeld Cup (the defunct Barrage had won three). Head coach Bill Daye stepped down a month after winning the Steinfeld Cup, citing he wanted to spend more time with his family. Entering the 2021 season, Daye remains the franchise's all-time leader in regular-season games coached (72), regular-season games won (43), and playoff games coached (6).

2013–2018
The Cannons in 2013 and 2014 finished 5–9 and 6–8. This included a 1–5 start in 2013 leading to Steve Duffy's firing on June 10. John Tucker took his place and played .500 for the rest of the season. After the Cannons missed the playoffs for the fourth time in franchise history in 2014, Tucker led the team back to the postseason in 2015 as the 8–6 fourth seed. They played the New York Lizards and lost 16–15 in overtime. The Lizards went on to win the Steinfeld Cup.

John Tucker left the Cannons after the 2015 season to become the first head coach and general manager of the expansion team Atlanta Blaze. On October 8, 2015, Sean Quirk was announced as the sixth head coach in franchise history. In an odd 2016 year in which seven of the league's nine teams, including the Cannons, finished with identical 8-6 records, Quirk's team was not rewarded with one of the four playoff spots after tie-breaking procedures. On December 20, 2016, it was announced that John Tucker would be returning to the Cannons as the team's offensive coordinator in 2017. Tucker was fired mid-season by the Blaze after a 3–7 start.

Despite a Week 1 win in 2017, the Cannons season turned around. At 3–6, the Cannons traded away captain Will Manny and Joe LoCascio to the New York Lizards for Dave Lawson and Chris LaPierre on June 27. On July 14, the Cannons announced that neither Lawson nor LaPierre would suit up for the team that season. Dave Lawson informed team officials that he would be retiring from the league while Chris LaPierre decided not to report to the team. The Cannons finished the season on a six-game losing streak. At 3-11, the Cannons posted the worst record in the league and tied their franchise-worst record from 2001, their inaugural season.

2019–2020: New pro lacrosse landscape and second title
Following the 2018 season, Paul Rabil launched the Premier Lacrosse League, baiting over 140 MLL players to migrate over. However, the Cannons maintained more of their roster than other teams like the Dallas Rattlers or Rabil's New York Lizards. Two months prior to the start of the 2019 season, the league cut the team roster from nine to six when the Ohio Machine and Florida Launch folded and Charlotte Hounds suspended operations for two seasons. Taking this to their advantage, the Cannons posted a 9–7 record in 2019, good enough for the third of four postseason seeds and gave Boston its first playoff berth since 2015. Boston faced the Denver Outlaws in the semifinal, who were also hosting Championship Weekend. The Cannons got off to a hot start and led by as many as six goals, but ultimately fell, 17–15, ending their season.

2019 was the Cannons' first season in Quincy. During the offseason they announced a move to and $1.5 million renovation of Veterans Memorial Stadium. The Cannons announced two sellouts in their first season in the updated venue.

Due to the COVID-19 pandemic, the 2020 season was shortened to five regular season games in seven days, all to be played in front of no fans at Navy-Marine Corps Memorial Stadium in Annapolis, Maryland. The Cannons finished fourth place out of six teams with a 3–2 record, and were the only team to defeat the Denver Outlaws in the regular season. Heading into the postseason, the Cannons were scheduled to play the Outlaws in the semifinal. However, after a player from the Chesapeake Bayhawks experience symptoms of COVID-19 and eventually tested positive, the two other postseason competitors, Chesapeake and Connecticut, withdrew from the tournament. The Cannons' semifinal game with the Outlaws was pushed back a day and would be played as the championship. Boston defeated Denver for the second time in two days, the latter in 13-10 fashion for the franchise's second title, first in nine years. Newcomer attackman Bryce Wasserman, who played for the Dallas Rattlers the season before, was named league MVP for 2020.

2021–present: PLL Cannons Lacrosse Club
On December 16, 2020, in a statement from Major League Lacrosse (MLL), the Boston Cannons officially became the eighth team in the Premier Lacrosse League (PLL). It was announced that the team would be dropping "Boston" from their name and become "Cannons Lacrosse Club" to fit league nomenclature, the roster would be set via an expansion draft, and the team would begin play in the PLL in the 2021 season. Small tweaks to the former Boston Cannons branding resulted in a PLL crest and logo reveal on January 12, 2021. One week later, the league announced that Sean Quirk would continue coaching at the helm of the Cannons identity.

The Cannons played their first game of the 2021 season on June 4 at Gillette Stadium in Foxborough, Massachusetts, falling to the Redwoods Lacrosse Club, 12–11. They would finish the season 7th in the league, falling in the first round of the playoffs.

General Managers
 David Gross (2001–2005)
 Jason Chandler (2006–2007)
 Mark Kastrud (2008–2011)
 Kevin Barney (2011–2017)

Current coaching staff
Head coach - Sean Quirk
Assistant coaches - John Klepacki, Sean Kirwan

All-Time Head Coaches

 Record updated through matches of June 4, 2021

Roster

(C) indicates captain

*Indicates player is on Unavailable to Travel list

**Indicates player is on PUP list
Source:

MLL Award Winners

Most Valuable Player
 Conor Gill: 2004
 Paul Rabil: 2009, 2011
 Matt Poskay: 2010
 Bryce Wasserman: 2020

Rookie of the Year
 Conor Gill: 2002

Coach of the Year
 Scott Hiller: 2002, 2005
 Bill Daye: 2011
 John Tucker: 2015
 Sean Quirk: 2020
Defensive Player of the Year
 Ryan Curtis: 2003
 Zach Goodrich: 2020

Offensive Player of the Year
 Paul Rabil: 2009, 2011, 2012
 Matt Poskay: 2010

Goalie of the Year
 Chris Garrity: 2005
 Kip Turner: 2010

David Huntley Man of the Year
 Nick Marrocco: 2019

Most Improved Player
 Chris Eck: 2009
 Davey Emala: 2015

PLL Award Winners
Eamon McEneaney Attackman of the Year

 Lyle Thompson: 2022

Welles Crowther Humanitarian Award
 Lyle Thompson: 2021, 2022
Jimmy Regan Teammate Award

 Brodie Merrill: 2022

Season-by-season records

Draft History

First Round Selections (MLL Collegiate Draft)

 2001: None
 2002: Steve Dusseau, Georgetown (2nd overall); Conor Gill, Virginia (3rd overall)
 2003: Chris Fiore, UMass (3rd overall)
 2004: Chris Passavia, Maryland (6th overall)
 2005: Johnny Christmas, Virginia (5th overall)
 2006: None
 2007: Kip Turner, Virginia (2nd overall)
 2008: Paul Rabil, Johns Hopkins (1st overall)
 2009: Brandon Corp, Colgate (4th overall)
 2010: Max Quinzani, Duke (3rd overall)
 2011: Shamel Bratton, Virginia (6th overall)
 2012: None
 2013: Cam Flint, Denver (6th overall)
 2014: Scott McWilliams, Virginia (8th overall)
 2015: Ryan Tucker, Virginia (4th overall); John Glesener, Army
 2016: Greg Coholan, Virginia (6th overall), Brandon Mullins, Syracuse (9th overall)
 2017: Sergio Perkovic, Notre Dame (2nd overall)
 2018: Trevor Baptiste, Denver (1st overall)
 2019: Zach Goodrich, Towson (3rd overall)
 2020: Nick Mellen, Syracuse (4th overall)

First Round Selections (PLL Collegiate Draft)
2021: None
2022: None

First Round Selections (PLL Entry Draft) 

 2020: Lyle Thompson (1st overall); Zach Goodrich (6th overall)

Community involvement
The Cannons often reach out to the local community, hosting a variety of lacrosse camps and events for local youth. In addition, the Cannons support MetroLacrosse, by arranging scholarships for MetroLacrosse players and donating tickets for each home game to MetroLacrosse players and families. MetroLacrosse also maintains a booth in the Fan Zone for each home game.

References

External links

 
2001 establishments in Massachusetts
Lacrosse teams in Massachusetts
Lacrosse clubs established in 2001
Sports in Norfolk County, Massachusetts
Quincy, Massachusetts